The Sweden men's national basketball team represents Sweden in international basketball competition. The national team is controlled by the Swedish Basketball Federation.

Sweden has qualified for the EuroBasket ten times throughout their history. Their best tournament result was the 11th place finish at the 1995 edition. The Scandinavian squad has also qualified for the Olympic Games once, in 1980, finishing in 10th place. However, Sweden still seeks qualification for their first appearance to the FIBA World Cup.

History

EuroBasket 1953
Sweden's European Basketball Championship debut came at EuroBasket 1953 in Moscow. Although the Swedes did not fare well in their first tournament appearance. As they lost all seven of their matches to finish in last place in the 17 team tournament.

EuroBasket 1955
Sweden's second appearance on the continental level came at EuroBasket 1955 in Budapest. The team got off to an demoralizing start by losing to Switzerland in their first match. Although Sweden would achieve their first ever win at the EuroBasket against Luxembourg in their second match of the preliminary phase. However, they followed it by losing their next two matches in the round as well to Romania, and the Soviet Union. They finished 4th out of the 5 teams in the group with an (1-3) record, and found themselves in the classification rounds. There, the team once again finished with an (1-3) record in their pool, with their only victory coming against Denmark. Two losses in the classification 13th–16th place semifinals and the 15th/16th place final (a rematch against Luxembourg) put Sweden at 16th place of the 18 teams.

Later years
Sweden qualified for the EuroBasket eight more times with their three best finishes coming in 1969, 1983 and 1995. They also made their lone Summer Olympics appearance in 1980. But overall the national team has struggled to reach an elite level of consistency to become a serious medal contender at major international tournaments. At some events, however, the team displayed potential. E.g. at the EuroBasket 2013 they beat the heavily favored former champion Russia 81-62.

Competitive record

FIBA World Cup

Olympic Games

EuroBasket

Results and fixtures

2021

2022

2023

Team

Current roster
Roster for the 2023 FIBA World Cup Qualifiers matches on 24 and 26 February 2023 against Germany and Estonia.

Depth chart

Head coach position
 Rolf Nilsson – (1991–1997)
 Jan Enjebo – (1998–2004)
 Kostas Flevarakis – (2005–2010)
 Brad Dean – (2010–2013)
 Vedran Bosnić – (2014–2018)
 Hugo López – (2018–2021)
 Kenneth Grant – (2021 Interim)
 Ludwig Degernäs – (2021–present)

Past rosters
1953 EuroBasket: finished 17th among 17 teams

3 Rune Erkers, 4 Kjell Eliasson, 5 Sture Herrman, 6 Staffan Widén, 7 Bo Widén, 8 Örjan Widén, 9 Åke Larsson, 10 Lars Olsson, 11 Erik Sundell, 12 Bengt Gustafsson, 13 Lars-Erik Keijser, 14 Per-Åke Hallberg (Coach: Lars-Åke Nilsson)

1955 EuroBasket: finished 16th among 18 teams

3 Staffan Widén, 4 Bo Widén, 5 Örjan Widén, 6 Jan Holmberg, 7 Alvin Tornblom, 8 Lars Helgostam, 9 Sture Herrman, 10 Per-Åke Hallberg, 11 Palle Cardell, 12 Bengt Gustafsson, 13 Jan Oldenmark, 14 Anders Renner, 15 Gustaf Ragge, 16 Nils af Trolle (Coach: Lars-Åke Nilsson)

1961 EuroBasket: finished 18th among 19 teams

4 Svante af Klinteberg, 5 Staffan Widén, 6 Udo Tohver, 7 Bo Widén, 8 Torbjörn Langemar, 9 Alvin Törnblom, 10 Bjorn Lundberg, 11 Lars Andersson, 12 Curt Wennström, 13 Örjan Widén, 14 Gunars Kraulis, 15 Lennart Dahllöf (Coach: Juris Reneslacis)

1965 EuroBasket: finished 16th among 16 teams

4 Hans Albertsson, 5 Jörgen Hansson, 6 Anders Grönlund, 7 Rune Leinas, 8 Per-Olof Svensson, 9 Ulf Lindelöf, 10 Björn Lundberg, 11 Torbjörn Langemar, 12 Lars Cullert, 13 Per-Olof Lefwerth, 14 Kaj Håkansson, 15 Egon Håkanson (Coach: Rolf Nygren)

1969 EuroBasket: finished 12th among 12 teams

4 Kjell Gunna, 5 Bo Lundmark, 6 Anders Grönlund, 7 Ulf Lindelöf, 8 Arturs Veigurs, 9 Ebbe Edström, 10 Janos Fugedi, 11 Jan Hjorth, 12 Per-Olof Lefwerth, 13 Kjell Rannelid, 14 Hans Albertsson, 15 Jörgen Hansson (Coach: Arne Jansson)

1980 Olympic Games: finished 10th among 12 teams

4 Peter Andersson, 5 Thomas Nordgren, 6 Peter Gunterberg, 7 Göran Unger, 8 Torbjörn Taxén, 9 Joon-Olof "Jonte" Karlsson, 10 Jan Enjebo, 11 Bernt Malion, 12 Roland Rahm, 13 Sten Feldreich, 14 Leif Yttergren, 15 Åke Skyttevall (Coach: Mike Perry)

1983 EuroBasket: finished 12th among 12 teams

4 Bill Magarity, 5 Bernt Malion, 6 Peter Nyström, 7 Jerry Sehlberg, 8 Thomas Nordgren, 9 Joon-Olof "Jonte" Karlsson, 10 Kenny Grant, 11 Bo Faleström, 12 Roland Rahm, 13 Sten Feldreich, 14 Göran Eriksson, 15 Åke Skyttevall (Coach: Sven Jensen)

1993 EuroBasket: finished 13th among 16 teams

4 Olle Håkanson, 5 Magnus Tegel, 6 Örjan Andersson, 7 Henrik Evers, 8 Henrik Gaddefors, 9 Peter Borg, 10 Martin Jansson, 11 Jens Tillman, 12 Torbjörn Gehrke, 13 Anders Marcus, 14 Per Stümer, 15 Mattias Sahlström (Coach: Rolf Nilsson)

1995 EuroBasket: finished 14th among 14 teams

4 Olle Håkanson, 5 Örjan Andersson, 6 Christian Larsson, 7 Henrik Evers, 8 Henrik Gaddefors, 9 Jonas Larsson, 10 Oscar Lefwerth, 11 Joakim Blom, 12 Torbjörn Gehrke, 13 Anders Marcus, 14 Vincent Lundahl, 15 Mattias Sahlström (Coach: Rolf Nilsson)

2003 EuroBasket: finished 16th among 16 teams

4 Paul Burke, 5 Hakan Larsson, 6 Jens Stalhandske, 7 Mats Levin, 8 Oluoma Nnamaka, 9 Jonas Larsson, 10 Lesli Myrthil, 11 Joakim Blom, 12 Fredrik Jonzen, 13 Christian Maråker, 14 John Pettersson, 15 Daniel Dajic (Coach: Jan Enjebo)

2013 EuroBasket: finished 13th among 24 teams

4 Ludvig Håkanson, 5 Jonathan Skjöldebrand, 6 Joakim Kjellbom, 7 Dino Pita, 8 Anton Gaddefors, 9 Brice Massamba, 10 Kenny Grant, 11 Jonas Jerebko, 12 Thomas Massamba, 13 Erik Rush, 14 Jeffery Taylor, 15 Viktor Gaddefors (Coach: Brad Dean)

Kit

Manufacturer
2018–2020: Spalding
2020–present: Adidas

Sponsors
Previously: Adlibris
2018–present: SJ (back)
2023–present: Nocco (front)

See also

Sport in Sweden
Sweden women's national basketball team
Sweden men's national under-20 basketball team
Sweden men's national under-18 basketball team
Sweden men's national under-16 basketball team

Notes

References

External links

Official website 
Sweden FIBA profile
Sweden National Team – Men at Eurobasket.com
Sweden Basketball Records at FIBA Archive

Videos
Sweden v Turkey – Full Game – FIBA EuroBasket 2022 qualifiers Youtube.com video

 
Men's national basketball teams
 
1952 establishments in Sweden